"Sunday Morning" is a song by Canadian hip hop musician k-os. It was released in September 2006 as the second from his 2007 album Atlantis: Hymns for Disco. The song peaked at number 19 on the Canadian Singles Chart making it k-os's 2nd highest charting song. The song made #5 on The MuchMusic Countdown. Sunday Morning was performed on The Late Show in early 2007. The song was also performed on the Vans Warped Tour 2007.

Music video
The music video consists of three parts. Part one shows k-os outside talking with a friend before a show. Suddenly a child comes by saying that the drummer for the performance is sick and cannot make it. K-os quickly finds a skilled drummer, Sebastien Grainger, close by playing on buckets in the street. When two girls try to go in with the drummer, he tells them to wait there.

The women quickly think that he is being cruel, and a thought bubble appears above both of them with a broken heart often used as comedy. Later in part two, K-os sings at a school dance in a 1980s or 1990s theme with photos taken. Part three is k-os walking in a beautiful grassy hillside with an acoustic guitar.

Charts and certifications

Chart positions

Certifications

References

External links

2006 songs
K-os songs